Giovanni Battista Belluzzi (1506–1554), also known as Giovanni Battista di Bartolomeo Bellucci and as Il Sanmarino, was a Sammarinese architect and military engineer. He was born in San Marino on September 27, 1506 and at 18 years of age was sent by his father to Bologna, to learn commerce under Bastiano di Ronco, a merchant of the Guild of Wool. 
After two years, he returned to San Marino, where he set up a wool business of his own.  His first wife, Cagli, died shortly after they were married.  His second wife was the daughter of Girolamo Genga (1467–1551).  The couple lived with Girolamo Genga, from whom Giovanni learned architecture.  In 1541, his second wife died, leaving Giovanni to raise two sons.  In 1543, Giovanni entered into the service of Cosimo I de' Medici, Grand Duke of Tuscany, as an engineer.  He designed fortifications for Florence, Pistoia, Pisa and San Miniato and also wrote a book on military architecture.  He was wounded in the siege of Montalcino and was killed by enemy fire in a fortress of Aiuola.

Works

References 
 Istituto della enciclopedia italiana, Dizionario biografico degli Italiani, Rome, Istituto della enciclopedia italiana, 1966.
 Thieme, Ulrich and Felix Becker, Allgemeines Lexikon der bildenden Künstler von der Antike bis zur Gegenwart, Reprint of 1907 edition, Leipzig, Veb E.A. Seemann Verlag, 1980–1986.
{{cite book | first= Stefano| last= Ticozzi| year=1830| title= Dizionario degli architetti, scultori, pittori, intagliatori in rame ed in pietra, coniatori di medaglie, musaicisti, niellatori, intarsiatori d’ogni etá e d’ogni nazione''' (Volume 1)| pages= 138 | publisher=Gaetano Schiepatti |location=Milan | url= https://books.google.com/books?id=0ownAAAAMAAJ }}
 Vasari, Giorgio, Le Vite delle più eccellenti pittori, scultori, ed architettori'', many editions and translations.

1506 births
1554 deaths
16th-century Italian architects
Italian Renaissance architects
Architects from Tuscany
Sammarinese male musicians
Renaissance architects